Robert Tredwye (or Robert de Tredewy) was the first prior of Mount Grace Priory on its founding in (about) 1398.  He is attested in a medieval charter, created between 18 February and 20 April 1398, now held in the collection at Ripley Castle in Yorkshire.

The charter brings the Priory into existence and calls for prayers to be said for King Richard II, members of the
Duke of Surrey's family, and John and Ellen de Ingelby, and for masses to be said for various people including Thomas de Ingelby and Katherine his wife.

References 

14th-century English Roman Catholic priests